31st Battalion may refer to:

 31st Battalion, Royal Queensland Regiment, a unit of the Australian Army
 31st/42nd Battalion, Royal Queensland Regiment, a unit of the Australian Army
 2/31st Battalion (Australia), a unit of the Australian Army that was raised during World War II
 31st (Alberta) Battalion, CEF, a unit of the Canadian Army
 31st Infantry Battalion (Estonia), a unit of the Estonian Army
 31st Engineer Battalion, a unit of the United States Army
 Combat Logistics Battalion 31, a unit of the United States Marine Corps

See also
 31st Division (disambiguation)
 31st Group (disambiguation)
 31st Brigade (disambiguation)
 31st Regiment (disambiguation)
 31st Squadron (disambiguation)